Paige Goodyear (born 2000) is an English amateur boxer who won a bronze medal at the 2018 Youth World Championships and reached the quarter-finals at the 2018 European Youth Championships.

References

2000 births
English women boxers
Sportspeople from Dudley
Middleweight boxers
Living people